Anton Aristarkhov (born 11 February 1999) is a Russian sports shooter.

References

1999 births
Living people
Russian male sport shooters
Shooters at the 2020 Summer Olympics
People from Noginsk
Olympic shooters of Russia
Sportspeople from Moscow Oblast